Next Door Spy—also known as Agathe Christine: Next Door Spy—is a 2017 Danish traditionally animated detective film written and directed by Karla von Bengtson (in her feature directorial debut). Released on 10 August 2017 by Copenhagen Bombay, an English dub was released on 16 June 2020 by TriCoast Entertainment. Despite the film's name, the plot has no relation to any of Agatha Christie's detective novels.

Premise 
Agathe Christine, or AC as she calls herself, wants to become a real detective, and establishes her own makeshift detective bureau in the basement of her home. One day, she meets a mysterious boy, Vincent, in a local shop, leading her to devote her full time and energy to surveilling him.

Voice cast 
The Danish voice cast for the film.
Simone Edemann Møgelbjerg as Agathe "AC" Christine
Oliver Bøtcher Herlevsen as Vincent
Kristine Sloth as Sanne
Anne-Grethe Bjarup Riis as Mor
Søs Egelind as Varanen
Tommy Kenter as Kiosk-Arne
Dar Salim as Vincent's father
Albert Rudbeck Lindhardt as Vincent's brother
Harald Kaiser Hermann as skater boy
Mille Lunderskov as selfie girl
Viggo Bengtson as Lillebror Bertil
Annevig Schelde Ebbe as the GPS voice

Release and reception 
Next Door Spy was released in Danish cinemas on 10 August 2017 by Copenhagen Bombay. An English dub was released on 16 June 2020 by TriCoast Entertainment. Critically, it received generally positive reviews in Denmark, but foreign reception was mixed. The story and characters received praise, but criticism was directed at the English dub's profanity and the talking lizard character as unnecessary.

Jacob Wendt Jensen, writing for Berlingske, gave the film five out of six stars, stating that the plot "is both exciting, charming and offers surprises," further adding "Next Door Spy can engage anyone who has the heart and their curiosity in the cinema." Bobby LePire of Film Threat, who gave the film a more critical score of one out of ten, was particularly critical of Agathe Christine's mother, stating that her not trying to understand Agathe's detective hobby made her "one of the worst, most unsympathetic parents in any movie who does not actively abuse or neglect their offspring."

References

External links 

Next Door Spy at the Danish Broadcasting Corporation (in Danish)

2017 films
2017 animated films
2010s children's animated films
2017 directorial debut films
Danish animated films
Danish children's films
Danish detective films